George Chad was an English diplomat. 

George Chad may also refer to:

Sir George Chad, Baronet of the Chad baronets

See also
Chad George, mixed martial artist
Chad (disambiguation)